The Milcov is a right tributary of the river Putna in eastern Romania. It flows through the towns and villages Andreiașu de Jos, Șindrilari, Mera, Broșteni, Odobești, Vârteșcoiu, Câmpineanca, Golești, Milcovul and Răstoaca. It discharges into the Putna in Răstoaca. The city of Focșani used to lie on it. Due to floods, however, the riverbed moved a few kilometers away, south of the city.

In 1482, Stephen the Great declared Milcov as the boundary between Wallachia and Moldavia. In the 19th century, the river was perceived by unionists as a symbol of discord between Wallachia and Moldavia—see "Hora Unirii", a poem by Vasile Alecsandri. The Milcov border was dispensed with in 1859, when Wallachia and Moldavia united to form the United Principalities.

Tributaries
The following rivers are tributaries to the river Milcov (from source to mouth):

Left: Reghiu, Milcovel, Arva
Right: Groza, Valea Rea, Valea Seacă, Pietroasa, Dălhăuți, Dâlgov

Gallery

References

Rivers of Romania
Rivers of Vrancea County